Lenjab-e Sofla (also Romanized as Lenjāb-e Soflá; also known as Lanjāb, Lanjāb-e Pā’īn, and Lanjab-i-Pāīn) is a village in Saruq Rural District, Saruq District, Farahan County, Markazi Province, Iran. At the 2006 census, its population was 64, in 16 families.

References 

Populated places in Farahan County